Intentions are a mental state that represents a commitment to carrying out actions in the future.

Intentions may also refer to:

 "Intentions" (Gorgon City song), 2013
 "Intentions" (Justin Bieber song), 2020
 "Intentions" (Macklemore song), 2017
 "Intentions (22)", 2019 song by Ziggy Alberts

See also
 Intent (disambiguation)
 Intention (disambiguation)